Dino Fetscher (born 9 June 1988) is a Welsh actor. He is known for his roles in the television series Banana, Cucumber, Paranoid, Gentleman Jack and Years and Years. He also starred as the synthetic Stanley in Humans.

Fetscher was born in Cardiff, Wales. His mother is German and his father is Welsh-Basque. In 2008, he was crowned Mr Gay UK. In 2017, he was nominated as Celebrity Rising Star at the British LGBT Awards.

Filmography

Awards and nominations

References

External links 
 
 

1988 births
Living people
21st-century British male actors
Male actors from Cardiff
Welsh LGBT actors
British people of Welsh descent
British people of German descent
British people of Basque descent
British male film actors
British male television actors
Welsh gay actors
20th-century LGBT people
21st-century LGBT people